Raul Marcel Barreto (September 6, 1948 – March 30, 2011) was a Brazilian footballer who played as a goalkeeper.

Career 
Barreto played at the youth level with Palmeiras and joined the first team in 1969. He had loan spells with América Futebol Clube, and Esporte Clube Noroeste. Throughout his tenure with Palmeiras he assisted in securing the Campeonato Brasileiro Série A in 1972, and 1973. He also assisted in winning the Campeonato Paulista in 1972. He played in the 1974 Copa Libertadores against São Paulo FC.

In late 1974 he signed with Santa Cruz Futebol Clube. In 1975, he played abroad in the National Soccer League with Windsor Stars. In 1976, he returned to Brazil to play with Portuguesa Santista.

He died on March 30, 2011, from a cerebral aneurysm.

International career 
Barreto was selected to represent Brazil in the 1968 Summer Olympics.

References  

1948 births
2011 deaths
Association football goalkeepers
Brazilian footballers
Sociedade Esportiva Palmeiras players
América Futebol Clube (SP) players
Esporte Clube Noroeste players
Santa Cruz Futebol Clube players
Associação Atlética Portuguesa (Santos) players
Campeonato Brasileiro Série A players
Canadian National Soccer League players
Olympic footballers of Brazil
Footballers at the 1968 Summer Olympics
Sportspeople from Campinas